Monika Athare (born 26 March 1992) is an Indian long distance runner. She competed in the women's marathon at the 2017 World Championships in Athletics.

References

External links

1992 births
Living people
Indian female long-distance runners
Indian female marathon runners
World Athletics Championships athletes for India
Place of birth missing (living people)